The 2010–11 UANL season was the 64th professional season of Mexico's top-flight football league. The season is split into two tournaments—the Torneo Apertura and the Torneo Clausura—each with identical formats and each contested by the same eighteen teams. UANL will begin their season on July 24, 2010 against Querétaro, UANL will play their homes games on Saturdays at 7:00pm.

Torneo Apertura

Squad

Regular season

Goalscorers

Transfers

In

Out

Results

Results summary

Results by round

Torneo Clausura

Squad 

 (Team Vice-Captain)

 (Club captain)

 (Team captain)

Regular season

Final phase 

Guadalajara won 4–2 on aggregate

Goalscorers

Results

Results summary

Results by round

References 

2010–11 Primera División de México season
Mexican football clubs 2010–11 season